Teymuraz Davidovich Mchedlishvili (born 18 April 1985) is a Ukrainian former professional footballer who played as a defender.

Career
In 2005 Mchedlishvili started his career at Spartaki Tbilisi. In 2006 he moved to Merani Tbilisi. In 2008, he moved to FC Desna-2 Chernihiv. In 2009 he moved to FC Yednist' Plysky. After bouncing around several amateur and lower-level sides, he signed with FC Chernihiv in 2017. On 1 May 2021 he scored a goal against Bukovyna in the 2020–21 Ukrainian Second League at the Chernihiv Arena.

Career statistics

By Club

Honours
FC Chernihiv
 Chernihiv Oblast Football Championship: 2019
 Chernihiv Oblast Football Cup: 2012

FC Yednist' Plysky 2
 Ukrainian Football Amateur League: 2009

References

External links
 Profile at FC Chernihiv
 
 

1985 births
Living people
Footballers from Zaporizhzhia
Ukrainian footballers
Footballers from Georgia (country)
Association football defenders
FC Chernihiv players
FC Desna-2 Chernihiv players
FC Avanhard Koriukivka players
Ukrainian Second League players